Free Up is reggae, dancehall artist Capleton's fifteenth studio album. 
It was released on June 27, 2006.

Track listing

2006 albums
Capleton albums